Khánh Vĩnh is a district (huyện) of Khánh Hòa province in the South Central Coast region of Vietnam.

As of 2003, the district had a population of 28,865. The district covers an area of 1,165 km². The district capital lies at Khánh Vĩnh.

References

Districts of Khánh Hòa province